Danny Kennedy (born 6 July 1959) is a Unionist politician in Northern Ireland, who served as the Chairman of the Ulster Unionist Party (UUP) from December 2019 to May 2022.  Kennedy previously served as a  Member of the Legislative Assembly (MLA) for Newry and Armagh from 1998 to 2017.

He was formerly deputy leader of the Ulster Unionist Party Assembly Group. He served in the Northern Ireland Executive as Minister for Regional Development from 2011 to 2015. On 12 May 2016, Kennedy was elected as Deputy Speaker of the Northern Ireland Assembly. It was confirmed that he had lost his seat as an MLA for Newry and Armagh on 3 March 2017.

Political career
Kennedy has served at all levels, both local and within the wider party organisation of the Ulster Unionist Party, which he joined in 1974. In 1996 he was an unsuccessful candidate in the Northern Ireland Forum election in Newry and Armagh. He ran unsuccessfully for the UUP in the Westminster election in 1997, in which he polled over 18,000 votes against Seamus Mallon. He was elected to the Assembly in 1998.

Kennedy was UUP Assembly spokesman for education and chaired the Assembly Committee which both scrutinised and helped frame education legislation between 1998 and 2002.  On the restoration of devolution in 2007 he became chairman of the Committee for the Office of the First Minister and deputy First Minister. His performance in this office garnered him the award for "Best Committee Chair" from the Slugger O'Toole blogsite in 2008.

Kennedy did not appeal an employment tribunal decision that found that a Protestant job applicant, Alan Lennon, had been discriminated against by Kennedy's predecessor Conor Murphy. Lennon was awarded £150,000 damages.

He contested the constituency of Newry and Armagh for the UUP in the 2005, 2010, and 2015 general elections, finishing fourth, third and second with 13.9%, 19.1% and 32.7% of the vote respectively.

Kennedy lost his seat as an MLA in the 2017 Northern Ireland Assembly election, which was held on 2 March 2017.

Kennedy was the Ulster Unionist Party candidate for Northern Ireland, during the  2019 European Parliament election in the United Kingdom; he was not elected.

On 23 December 2019, Kennedy was appointed to be the Chairman of the Ulster Unionist Party, replacing Reg Empey.

He stood down as UUP Chairman on 21 May 2022.

References

External links
 NI Assembly page
 UUP Profile

|-

1959 births
Living people
People from Newry
British Telecom people
Presbyterians from Northern Ireland
Councillors in Northern Ireland
Ministers of the Northern Ireland Executive (since 1999)
Ulster Unionist Party MLAs
Northern Ireland MLAs 1998–2003
Northern Ireland MLAs 2003–2007
Northern Ireland MLAs 2007–2011
Northern Ireland MLAs 2011–2016
Northern Ireland MLAs 2016–2017